Nybster is a scattered rural and crofting township, situated in Caithness and is in the Scottish council area of Highland.

It is the location of the Nybster Broch, first excavated by Rev James Maxwell Joass (of Golspie in 1895 and again by Sir Francis Tress Barry in about 1900. A broch is an Iron Age building that is unique to Scotland. This one was probably built between about 200 BC and 200 AD and re-used during the Pictish period (AD 300 - 800). The Caithness Broch Centre nearby provides an opportunity to learn more about the communities that lived in the brochs, those who excavated them and the communities who are still involved with them today.

References

Populated places in Caithness